Lindner is a German surname, which may refer to:

 Lindner family, American business family based in Cincinnati, Ohio
 Lindner (agricultural machinery manufacturer), Austrian family company
 Arlon Lindner (1935–2021), American businessman and politician
 Bob Lindner (born 1962), Australian rugby league player
 Carl Lindner (disambiguation), multiple people
 Christian Lindner (born 1979), German politician
 Dieter Lindner (racewalker) (born 1937), German race walker
 Dieter Lindner (footballer) (born 1939), German football player
 Doris Lindner (1896–1979), British sculptor
 Dörte Lindner (born 1974), German diver
 Ernest Lindner (1897–1988), Austrian/Canadian painter
 Eugen Lindner (1858–1915), German composer
 Erwin Lindner (1888–1988), German entomologist
 Johann Lindner (born 1959), Austrian hammer thrower and bobsledder
 Patrick Lindner (born 1960), German singer
 Richard Lindner (disambiguation), multiple people
 Robert Lindner (1916–1967), Austrian actor
 Robert M. Lindner (1914–1956), American author and psychologist
 Tobias Lindner (born 1982), German politician

See also 
 Lintner (disambiguation)
 Lind (disambiguation)
 Linde (disambiguation)

German-language surnames